"Bigger Than You" (stylized as Bigger > You) is a single by American rapper 2 Chainz featuring rappers Drake and Quavo, released on June 15, 2018. The lyrics were written by the rappers, while the music was written and produced by Illmind and Murda Beatz.

Music video 
A music video was released on September 19, 2018 on 2 Chainz's Vevo account on YouTube. Directed by Nathan R. Smith, it features child versions of Chainz, Drake, Quavo and Murda Beatz causing chaos in a school. The quartet raps while standing atop tables and strutting around a hallway.

Charts

Certifications

References 

2018 singles
2018 songs
2 Chainz songs
Drake (musician) songs
Quavo songs
Songs written by 2 Chainz
Songs written by Drake (musician)
Songs written by Quavo
Songs written by Murda Beatz
Songs written by Illmind
Song recordings produced by Murda Beatz
Def Jam Recordings singles